"Lonely Nation" is a song by the rock group Switchfoot. It is the first track on the 2005 record, Nothing Is Sound.

Song history
Switchfoot frontman Jon Foreman, had this to say about the song:

As a single
The song was slated to be released as the follow-up single to the 2005 hit Stars, but was pulled by the band's label, Sony BMG before release.

A portion of a music video was also shot for the song, but the full video was never completed. Clips from the video can be found during a montage on Switchfoot's popular self-made DVD, Switchfootage 2.

References

External links
Lyrics

2005 songs
Switchfoot songs
Songs written by Jon Foreman
Songs written by Tim Foreman
Song recordings produced by John Fields (record producer)